Ballyward railway station was on the Great Northern Railway (Ireland) which ran from Banbridge to Castlewellan in Northern Ireland.

History
 
The station was opened on 24 March 1906.

The station closed on 2 May 1955.

References 

Disused railway stations in County Down
Railway stations opened in 1906
Railway stations closed in 1955
1906 establishments in Ireland
1955 disestablishments in Northern Ireland
Railway stations in Northern Ireland opened in the 20th century